Pixelworks was set up in 1997 and now is based in San Jose, California. Pixelworks provides video and pixel processing semiconductors and software. In addition, the company also provides digital display, projection devices and digital signage.

Products 

Leadership 
It was co-founded by Allen Alley, an Oregon politician. Bruce A. Walicek is the CEO and president of the company.

References
Specific

General
 "Pixelworks Reports First Quarter 2016 Financial Results; Names Todd DeBonis Chief Executive Officer"
 
 
 
 
 
 

Companies established in 1997
Companies listed on the Nasdaq